Brójce  is a village in Łódź East County, Łódź Voivodeship, in central Poland. It is the seat of the gmina (administrative district) called Gmina Brójce.

The village has a population of 385.

References
 Central Statistical Office (GUS) Population: Size and Structure by Administrative Division - (2007-12-31) (in Polish)

Villages in Łódź East County